Luis E. Pierri Barros (born 10 March 1963) is an Uruguayan former basketball player who competed in the 1984 Summer Olympics.

References

1963 births
Living people
Uruguayan men's basketball players
1982 FIBA World Championship players
Olympic basketball players of Uruguay
Basketball players at the 1984 Summer Olympics
Basketball players at the 1987 Pan American Games
Basketball players at the 1995 Pan American Games
Pan American Games competitors for Uruguay
Place of birth missing (living people)